Cheng Xiao (born July 15, 1998) is a Chinese singer, dancer and actress. Cheng Xiao made her debut as a member of the South Korean-Chinese girl group WJSN in 2016. In early-2018, she began her solo activities in China and took a hiatus from the group since then. After a five-year hiatus from WJSN, she left the group in March 2023.

Early life
Cheng was born on July 15, 1998, in Nanshan District, Shenzhen, Guangdong. She has a younger sister, Cheng Chen. Cheng studied in Shenzhen Art School, and graduated from School of Performing Arts Seoul in 2016, where she studied under the Department of Practical Dance.

Career

2015–2017: Debut with WJSN 

On December 10, 2015, Cheng was revealed as one of the members of WJSN's Wonder Unit. On December 21, she released a Christmas cover of "All I Want For Christmas Is You" by Mariah Carey with WJSN through JuseTV's YouTube Channel.

Cheng debuted with WJSN on February 25, 2016, with the release of their debut mini album Would You Like?, including the title tracks "Mo Mo Mo" and "Catch Me".

In August 2016, Cheng, together with fellow group mates Exy, SeolA, Soobin, Eunseo, Yeoreum, and Dayoung, teamed up with label mate Monsta X to form the unit Y-Teen, a project unit group that will be promoting as CF models for KT's phone fare service.

On September 14, she was proclaimed winner of Pitch King, and on September 15, she won gold for the rhythmic gymnastics segment during the Idol Star Athletics Championships XII.

Cheng along with GFriend's Eunha, Oh My Girl's YooA, Gugudan's Nayoung and Momoland's Nancy formed a special project group Sunny Girls for Inkigayo's Music Crush Project. They released their single, "Taxi" on November 27, 2016.

On January 30, 2017, Cheng participated in the Idol Star Athletics Championships XIII, where she won a bronze medal during the rhythmic gymnastics segment.

2017–present: Solo activities and departure from WJSN
In 2017, Cheng was a cast member of SBS' Law of the Jungle.

In 2018, Cheng was a cast member and dance mentor in the reality survival show Idol Producer. The same year, she was cast in her first costume drama, Legend of Awakening. In November 2018, Cheng released her first solo song "If Love", an OST for online game Xuanyuan Sword which debuted at No. 3 in QQ Music.

In 2020, Cheng acted in her first drama, Detective Chinatown.

In January 2021, Cheng debuted as a solo artist, with the single "Focus X". Throughout the year, she was also cast as the main role in various dramas such as the Chinese e-sport romance comedy television series Falling Into Your Smile.

On March 3, 2023, Starship Entertainment announced that Cheng had departed from WJSN after her contract expired.

Discography

Singles

Filmography

Film

Television series

Television show

Awards and nominations

References

External links

 

1998 births
Living people
K-pop singers
Starship Entertainment artists
Korean-language singers of China
Chinese K-pop singers
Singers from Shenzhen
Cosmic Girls members
21st-century Chinese women singers
Chinese expatriates in South Korea
Chinese television actresses
21st-century Chinese actresses
Actresses from Guangdong
School of Performing Arts Seoul alumni